The discography of English hip hop trio N-Dubz consists of twenty-one singles, three studio albums, two extended plays, 28 music videos, five video album and one compilation album. N-Dubz have won four MOBO awards; Best Newcomer in 2007, Best Album for their debut album Uncle B) and Best Act in 2009 and Best Song in 2010 for their single "Playing with Fire" featuring Mr Hudson. The band released their first compilation album, Greatest Hits, on 28 November 2011 after announcing indefinite hiatus so the members could focus on solo projects. Following an eleven-year hiatus, N-Dubz released their comeback single "Charmer" in 2022, which reached number thirty-two on the UK Singles Chart.

Albums

Studio albums

Compilation album

Video albums
 ZeeTVD: Behind the Scenes (2009)
 N-Dubz Video EP (2010)
 The Making of Love.Live.Life (2011)
 Before They Were Dubz (2011)
 Love.Live.Life Live at the O2 Arena (2011)

Extended plays

Singles

As lead artist

As featured artist

Music videos

Other appearances

References

Discographies of British artists